The list of shipwrecks in March 1826 includes some ships sunk, foundered, grounded, or otherwise lost during March 1826.

1 March

2 March

3 March

4 March

6 March

7 March

9 March

10 March

11 March

12 March

13 March

15 March

16 March

18 March

20 March

21 March

23 March

24 March

26 March

28 March

29 March

30 March

31 March

Unknown date

References

1826-03